Michael Andrews is a Nigerian boxer. He competed in the men's featherweight event at the 1972 Summer Olympics.

References

External links

Year of birth missing (living people)
Living people
Nigerian male boxers
Olympic boxers of Nigeria
Boxers at the 1972 Summer Olympics
Place of birth missing (living people)
Featherweight boxers